The  Castle of Tawseelah  (from ,, Aamaj castle is a fortified structure surrounded by trenches in North Kukherd Rural District in Kukherd District, Hormozgan Province in south Iran.

Location

Tawseelah castle was a squared fortified structure situated 1000 away from Kukherd city and located on an average hill above the palm oasis in the Shamo valley in the Durakhi mountain   at Northern west of Kukherd city, which added remarkably to its altitude and height.  The total length of its interface from the North is about 111  metres, while its Northern interface extends over 67.5 metres. The structure was also near to the  Nakh Mountain.

History

The history of Tawseelah castle goes back to the Sassanid  era (226–651). It was the center of government of that area as well as it acted as fortified military base for some time and was surrounded by a huge trench for protection.  A trench was an ancient defensive strategic feature utilized to defend the cities, castles and the forts in Persia before Islamic era. The Castle of Tawseelah was maintained until 1163–1192. It was destroyed by an earthquake in Kukherd city, and was affected by the flood in 1367, which destroyed the remainder of the castle. This is the third castle In Kukherd city in the Hormozgan Province of southern Iran.

1. Castle of Aamaj
2 . Castle of Siba
3. Castle of Tawseelah
	

Castle of Siba
Bastak
Bandar Lengeh
Hormozgān
Maghoh
AL madani
Paraw Kukherd
The Historic Bath of Siba
Sassanid family tree — of the Sasanian (Sassanid) dynasty

References 

2.	الكوخردى ، محمد ، بن يوسف، (كُوخِرد حَاضِرَة اِسلامِيةَ عَلي ضِفافِ نَهر مِهران) الطبعة الثالثة ،دبى: سنة 199۷ للميلاد **Mohammed Kookherdi (1997) Kookherd, an Islamic civil at Mehran river,  third edition: Dubai
3.	محمدیان، کوخری، محمد ، “ (به یاد کوخرد) “، ج1. ج2. چاپ اول، دبی: سال انتشار 2003 میلادی Mohammed Kookherdi Mohammadyan (2003), Beyade Kookherd, third edition : Dubai.
4.محمدیان، کوخردی ، محمد ،  «شهرستان بستک و بخش کوخرد»  ، ج۱. چاپ اول، دبی: سال انتشار ۲۰۰۵ میلادی Mohammed Kookherdi Mohammadyan (2005), Shahrestan  Bastak & Bakhshe Kookherd, First edition : Dubai.
5.	Peter Jackson and Lawrence Lockhart (Ed) (1986), Vol. 6th,  The Cambridge History of Iran: Cambridge University Press
5.Human Anthropology in Persia
6.محمدیان، کوخری، محمد. (وصف کوخرد)  ج1. چاپ دوم، دبی: سال انتشار 1998 میلادی Mohammed Kookherdi Mohammadyan (1998), Wasf Kookherd, second  edition : Dubai
7.محمدیان ، کوخردی، محمد ،  « مشایخ مدنی »   ، چاپ دوم، دبی:   سال انتشار ۲۰۰۲ میلادی Mohammed Kookherdi Mohammadyan (2002), Mashaykh Madani, second  edition : Dubai
8. اطلس گیتاشناسی استان‌های ایران [Atlas Gitashenasi Ostanhai Iran] (Gitashenasi Province Atlas of Iran)
9. درگاه فهرست آثار ملی ایران 
10.« Huwala Arab History » Engineer: Mohammed gharhb Hatem,  third edition : Egypt (Cairo),1997 & 2013   
11.   «  Kookherd, an Islamic District on the bank of Mehran River»  Mohammadian, Kukherdi,Mohammad (2000), third edition:Dubai U.A.E
 درگاه فهرست آثار ملی ایران
 فهرست آثار فرهنگی تاریخی ثبت شده در فهرست آثار ملی شهرستان بستک

External links 
  Kookherd website.

Sasanian castles
Castles in Iran
Kukherd District
Archaeological sites in Iran
Monuments and memorials in Iran
Buildings and structures in Kukherd District
National works of Iran